Eric Asamoah-Frimpong Karikari (born 14 February 1990 in Mampong Nsuta) is a Ghanaian professional footballer who plays for Nigerian side Niger Tornadoes.

Career 
Asamoah joined in November 2009 from Nigeria Premier League club Enyimba to Tunisian top club Étoile du Sahel and made short time later on 22 November 2009 his debut against Club Africain, in which he scored his first goal for his new club.

Personal life
He is the younger brother of Joetex Asamoah Frimpong.

References

1990 births
Living people
Ghanaian footballers
Expatriate footballers in Tunisia
Association football midfielders
Étoile Sportive du Sahel players
CS Hammam-Lif players
Enyimba F.C. players
Bayelsa United F.C. players
Ghanaian expatriate footballers
Ghanaian expatriate sportspeople in Nigeria
Expatriate footballers in Nigeria
Ghanaian expatriate sportspeople in Tunisia